The Drents Museum is an art and history museum in Assen, Drenthe, in the Netherlands. The museum was opened in 1854. It has a collection of prehistorical artifacts, applied art, and visual art. The museum also has temporary exhibitions. In 2013, it had 227,000 visitors.

History 
The museum was founded by the King's Commissioner of Drenthe on 28 November 1854 as the Provincial Museum of Drents Antiquities.

On 6 November 2007, the museum announced that architect Erick van Egeraat was chosen to design a new extension for the museum. Total costs were estimated at eighteen million euros. From summer 2010 to summer 2011 the museum was closed. At the beginning of 2010, a new modern depot facility for approximately 90,000 objects and works of art was completed. The new wing was opened officially in November 2011.

The museum conducted a CT scan and endoscopy of a statue of Buddha that documented the presence of a mummy identified as that of a monk, Liuquan, a Buddhist master of the Chinese Medical School. The statue is reported to date to the eleventh or twelfth century. The mummy will be put on display at the Hungarian Natural History Museum through May 2015.

Collection 
The museum has a large permanent collection of prehistoric artifacts from the province of Drenthe. It includes exhibits of bog bodies such as the Yde Girl, the Weerdinge Men, Exloërmond Man, and the Emmer-Erscheidenveen Man. There are finds from the Funnelbeaker culture, and the collection also includes the oldest recovered canoe in the world, the Pesse canoe, that dates between 8200 and 7600 BC.

An annex building has period rooms demonstrating the lifestyle of well-to-do Drenthe families from various time periods. This building also houses ceramics pertaining to the House of Orange known as the collection Bontekoe. In the garden stands a statue of Bartje Bartels, the main character of books by Anne de Vries, and a symbol of the province of Drenthe.

The museum holds a permanent collection of figurative art with particular attention to Realism from northern Europe and representatives of the fourth generation of Dutch abstract figurative artists such as Matthijs Röling. There also is a collection of art and applied art from 1885 to 1935 with work by Vincent van Gogh, Jan Toorop, and Jan Sluijters.

Administration 
Harry Tupan is the museum director. Annemiek Rens is the chief curator.

In 2013, the museum had 227,000 visitors.

References

External links 
 
 

 
1854 establishments in the Netherlands
Art museums and galleries in the Netherlands
Buildings and structures in Assen
History museums in the Netherlands
Museums established in 1854
Museums in Drenthe
Natural history museums in the Netherlands
19th-century architecture in the Netherlands